Diceroprocta biconica, or the Key's cicada, is a species of cicada in the family Cicadidae. It is found in the Caribbean Sea and North America.

References

Further reading

 
 

Diceroprocta
Articles created by Qbugbot
Insects described in 1850